Michele or Michelle Mitchell may refer to:

 Michele Mitchell (diver) (born 1962), American diver
 Michele Mitchell (journalist) (born 1970), American filmmaker, journalist and author
 Michelle Mitchell (born 1972), chief executive of Cancer Research UK